is a bay located in the East China Sea in the center of Nagasaki Prefecture, Japan.

Geography 

This corresponds with about 8% of the total area of the prefecture.

The bay is surrounded by land in all directions, thus it appears as an inland sea on maps. In between the Hario and Haiki Straits lies Hario Island. Opposite Ōmura city lies the largest island of the bay: Mishima (箕島), where Nagasaki Airport is located. For this purpose, the island first had to be flattened and reshaped.

Along the bay shore lie the following towns, clockwise from the north: Sasebo, Kawatana, Higashisonogi, Ōmura, Isahaya, Nagayo, Togitsu, Nagasaki and Saikai.

Biology 
Because of the geography of the bay there is only a small exchange of water from the bay with the sea. Consequently, the marine life in the bay is different from that in the nearby sea. The bay houses a rare species of finless porpoise, which does not leave the bay during its lifetime. Indo-Pacific bottlenose dolphins and common dolphins may migrate into the basin on unclear regularities.  Another special inhabitant – sometimes characterised as a living fossil – is the horseshoe crab species Tachypleus tridentatus. Despite being nearly separated from the sea, and the large cities along its shore, the bay is full of fish. About 60 species of marine animals are fished.

References 

Bays of Kyushu
Landforms of Nagasaki Prefecture